The 1935 Star Riders' Championship was decided over twenty heats, and the rider with the highest total score was crowned as champion. Tom Farndon and Ron Johnson did not take part after crashing the night before at the New Cross Stadium, an accident that cost Farndon his life the day after the final. Geoff Pymar and Norman Parker replaced them.

1935 was the final running of the Star Riders' Championship. From 1936, Motorcycle speedway would have its own official Speedway World Championship.

Final 
29 August 1935
 Wembley, England

References 

1935
Speedway
1935 in speedway